The Theban Mapping Project is an archaeological expedition devoted to Ancient Egypt. It was established in 1978 by the Egyptologist Dr. Kent R. Weeks at the University of California, Berkeley. In 1985, it was moved to the American University in Cairo. The Project's original goal was to create an archaeological map of the Valley of the Kings, and that was published as the Atlas of the Valley of the Kings in 2000. Since 2001, the Project has also developed a management plan for the Valley of the Kings, which is funded by the World Monuments Fund.

The website had not been online for several years, due to lack of funding. However, with new funds having been made available by the American Research Center in Egypt, it went online again in January 2021, with new features and data.

See also
Amarna Royal Tombs Project

References

External links
 Project website

Valley of the Kings
Cartography organizations
Egyptology
1978 establishments in the United States
Research projects
African expeditions